Spearmint are a London-based indie pop band, founded in 1995 by Shirley Lee. The group has received  coverage in the NME, Time Out, Melody Maker and Uncut magazines.

The original lineup included founder Shirley Lee (guitar and lead vocals), Simon Calnan (keyboard and backing vocals), Ronan Larvor (drums), and Martin Talbot (bass guitar). Forming their own record label (which they named hitBack), the group released their earliest songs as vinyl white labels. James Parsons replaced Talbot before the release of the band's second single, "Goldmine". Dickon Edwards joined as second guitarist around the time of the album A Week Away. Parsons soon replaced him, the bass vacancy filled by Andy Lewis.. They have more recently reverted to the four-piece line-up of the late 1990s.

The band were referenced in the film (500) Days of Summer wherein Joseph Gordon-Levitt's character states “It pains me we live in a world where nobody's heard of Spearmint.”

Album discography
Studio albums
 A Week Away (1999)
 Oklahoma (2000)
 A Different Lifetime (2001)
 My Missing Days (2003)
 The Boy and the Girl That Got Away (2005)
 Paris in a Bottle (2006)
 News from Nowhere (2014)
 It's Time to Vanish (2016)
 Are You from the Future? (2019)
 Holland Park (2021)

Compilation albums
 Songs for the Colour Yellow (1998)
 A Leopard and Other Stories (2004)

References

External links
 The band's web site
 All Spearmint's lyrics and an expansive collection of photos

British indie pop groups